Mohammad Ruman Shana (born 8 June 1995) is a Bangladeshi archer. He won the bronze medal in recurve single's event of 2019 World Archery Championships and became the first Bangladeshi archer in history to win a medal in the competition. He lives in Khulna. Shana won gold in the men's singles recurve category at the 2019 Asia Cup in the Philippines.

Early life 
Ruman born to the family of Abdul Gafur Shana and Beauty Begom and passed his childhood at Koyra village in Khulna. He used to play with arrow-bow made by bamboo during his school days. In an interview with BDnews24, he said that he was not much attentive to his school, instead, he used to remain busy playing football. However, he later opted to try his hand in archery when he was a student of class eighm
></ref>

Career 
Ruman won the gold medal in the First Asian Grand Prix 2014 in Bangkok, Thailand. He won another gold medal in the International Archery Tournament 2017, Bishkek, Kyrgyzstan.

In 2019, he won three international medal with first one- a silver medal- came in the ISSF International Solidarity Archery Championships. After that, he won a bronze in the 2019 World Archery Championships, and later, Roman won a gold medal in the Asia Cup ranking tournament.

23 May 2021, he along with Diya Siddique claimed silver medal in the recurve mixed team event during the 2021 Archery World Cup where Bangladesh emerged as runners-up to Netherlands in the final. Despite losing the final 5–1, it was the best performance by Bangladesh at an Archery World Championship. It also marked the first instance whereas Bangladesh managed to reach final in an event of Archery World Cup.

References

External links
 
 Ruman Shana at the World Archery Federation

Bangladeshi male archers
Living people
1995 births
World Archery Championships medalists
Archers at the 2014 Asian Games
Archers at the 2018 Asian Games
Asian Games competitors for Bangladesh
People from Khulna District
21st-century Bengalis
Olympic archers of Bangladesh
Archers at the 2020 Summer Olympics
South Asian Games gold medalists for Bangladesh
South Asian Games medalists in archery
Islamic Solidarity Games medalists in archery